Nesamony Memorial Christian College is an institution of arts and science in Marthandam, the second busiest town in Kanyakumari district, Tamil Nadu, India. The college was run by Kanyakumari Diocese of the Church of South India. It is one of the three colleges of the southern districts, along with Scott Christian College and South Travancore Hindu College, to be accredited by NAAC as a 5 Star institution.

History
In the year 1868, Rev. James Emlyn from New Castle, U.K. an LMS missionary bought the lands where the college is located now. Rev. Robert Sinclair, who succeeded Rev. Emlyn in the year 1910, built a bungalow and started a boarding school on the campus measuring 32 acres.

After independence, the long-felt need for a college at Marthandam resulted in the starting of the Christian College in June 1964 by the Kanyakumari Diocese of the Church of South India. The executive committee of the diocese, which met on 4 January, 1964, entrusted the responsibility of raising funds for the buildings needed to an ad-hoc committee consisting of Messrs. N. Dennis, Ex. MP(Convener) G.A. Ambrose, J. Nesamony, P.S. Wilson and Rev. M.Amose. The Diocese set apart sufficient extent of wetlands as an endowment to satisfy the university requirement. The public in and around Marthandam, the parents, students and members of the teaching and non-teaching staff took a keen interest in the growth of the college and contributed substantial amounts at different times for its development.

With the permission of the Madras University, the Pre-University class was started in 1964 with just 171 students. The college was inaugurated on 6 August 1964 by the then Bishop Rt. Rev. I.R.H. Gnanadason.

In June 1984, the college was renamed as Nesamony Memorial Christian College in recognition of the service rendered by the late Thiru. A. Nesamony M.A, B.L to the Kanyakumari Diocese of the Church of South India.

The college is accredited with "A" Grade by the NAAC.

Patron
The Patron of the institution is Marshal A. Nesamony. He was born in 1895 at Nesarpuram in Vilavancode taluk, Kanyakumari District. He graduated at Trivandrum Maharaja College, Thiruvananthapuram, and studied law at Law College, Thiruvananthapuram. He was among the people who had a role in merging South Travancore (Kanyakumari) to Tamil Nadu.

Administration
The institution is owned and managed by the Kanyakumari Diocese of the Church of South India. The executive committee of the Diocese appoints the Principal of the college. The College Governing Board, constituted by the Diocese, makes all other appointments subject to the approval of the executive committee. The Major Financial and administrative policies of the college are formulated by the Governing Board. The general administration of the college vests in the Principal. He is assisted by the Vice-Principal in the day-to-day administration of the college.

Emblem
The emblem of the college bears a Cross, a Church, a Palmyrah tree, a Star, a Book and a Lotus flower. The Cross indicates that the college is a Christian institution. The Church signifies sanctification, as one gets sanctification through prayers. The Palmyrah tree is a feature of the district where the college is located. At the top is a star which stands for guidance. The open Book and the Lotus, India's National flower, symbolize Knowledge and Wisdom respectively.

The motto of the institution is "Faith, Endeavour and Power".

Courses

Undergraduate courses

Aided
B.Sc(Mathematics)
B.Sc(Physics)
B.Sc(Computer Science)
B.Sc(Chemistry)
B.Sc(Botany)
B.Sc(Zoology)
BA(Tamil)
BA(English)
BA(History)
BA(Economics)
B.Com

Self-supporting
BCA
BBA
B.Sc(Computer Science)
B.Com.(Computer Application)
B.A.(Tourism)

Postgraduate

Aided
M.Sc(Chemistry)
M.Sc(Computer Science)
M.Sc(Botany)
M.Sc(Zoology)
M.Sc(Bioinformatics)
M.Sc(Mathematics)
M.Sc(Physics)
MA(Tamil)
MA(English)
MA(Economics)
MA(History)
M.Com
MBA(AICTE approved)
MCA(AICTE approved)
MTM
P.G Diploma in Bioinformatics (UGC sponsored Bioinformatics Programme)

See also

List of Colleges in Kanyakumari District

External links
 Official website

Christian universities and colleges in India
Universities and colleges in Kanyakumari district
Educational institutions established in 1964
1964 establishments in Madras State
Colleges affiliated to Manonmaniam Sundaranar University
Academic institutions formerly affiliated with the University of Madras